Goo Hyun-sook  is a South Korean TV series writer. She debuted in 1999.

List of works

Awards and nominations

References

Living people
Chung-Ang University alumni
Year of birth missing (living people)